Dylan Smith (born 27 May 1996) is an Australian professional footballer who plays as a winger for North Eastern MetroStars.

He made his professional debut in the A-league against Melbourne City FC on 25 April 2015.

On 2 October 2018, he was announced to have signed a contract with NPL South Australia side North Eastern MetroStars.

External links

 foxsportspulse profile

References

1996 births
Living people
Association football midfielders
Australian soccer players
Adelaide United FC players
A-League Men players
National Premier Leagues players